Littoraria ianthostoma is a species of sea snail, a marine gastropod mollusk in the family Littorinidae, the winkles or periwinkles.

Description

Distribution

References

External links

Littorinidae
Gastropods described in 2002